Eitel Friedrich may refer to:

People 

 Eitel Friedrich II, Count of Hohenzollern (c. 1452–1512)
 Eitel Friedrich of Zollern (1454–1490), German nobleman who served as Admiral of the Netherlands
 Eitel Friedrich III, Count of Hohenzollern (1494–1525)
 Eitel Friedrich IV, Count of Hohenzollern (1545–1605), also Count Eitel Friedrich I of Hohenzollern-Hechingen
 Eitel Frederick von Hohenzollern-Sigmaringen (1582–1625), Roman Catholic Cardinal-Priest and Prince-Bishop of Osnabrück
 Prince Eitel Friedrich of Prussia (1883–1942), Prussian prince and general
 Eitel-Friedrich Kentrat (1906–1974), German World War II naval officer

Ships 
 SS Prinz Eitel Friedrich, a list of ships
 SMS Prinz Eitel Friedrich, a list of ships
 Prinzess Eitel Friedrich